Andrew Gerard Simpson (born 1 January 1989) is an actor from Northern Ireland. He was spotted while performing in a festival by talent scout Patrick Duncan, who was working for Aisling Walsh, the director of Song for a Raggy Boy. He is best known for playing Steven Connolly in Notes on a Scandal.

Early life

Simpson was born in Derry, Northern Ireland, and grew up in the village of Fahan in neighbouring County Donegal, Republic of Ireland. However, he was educated in Derry and attended Foyle College. His mother sent her four children to Sandra Biddle's speech and drama school in the city.

Career 
Simpson's first film appearance was as Gerard Peters 458 in Song for a Raggy Boy (2003), a story about an Irish reform school. In 2006, he appeared opposite Cate Blanchett and Judi Dench in the film Notes on a Scandal. He plays the role of Steven Connolly, a schoolboy whose affair with his art teacher, Sheba Hart (played by Blanchett), leads to disaster. For the role, he earned a five figure sum, which he used to buy a home and pay for university.

In 2012 he appeared in the docudrama Saving The Titanic as electrician Albert Ervine, the youngest member of the engineering crew, which reunited him with Song for a Raggy Boy co-star Chris Newman. In November 2012 he played the part of Nick Nickleby in the BBC drama of the same name, a modern take on the Charles Dickens classic Nicholas Nickleby.

In 2015 Simpson had his first major leading role in Abner Pastoll's Road Games. He re-teamed with director Abner Pastoll for the crime thriller A Good Woman Is Hard to Find starring Sarah Bolger, which was released in 2019.

Personal life 
In school, Andrew received four A grades at A-level and went on to attend the London School of Economics in 2010. After completing his law degree, he returned to Ireland and worked at a building site while continuing to audition. As of 2016, Simpson worked as a hotel manager.

Filmography

References

External links

1989 births
Living people
Male film actors from Northern Ireland
Actors from Derry (city)
People educated at Pangbourne College
Male actors from County Londonderry